Wichita Falls Independent School District (WFISD) is a public school district based in Wichita Falls, Texas, United States and is accredited by the Texas Education Agency.

Wichita Falls ISD serves most of Wichita Falls (including portions of Sheppard Air Force Base). Varying parts of north Wichita Falls are included in the City View Independent School District and the Burkburnett Independent School District.

The Wichita Falls ISD was one of the few Texas school districts to offer a choice program that gives parents the choice of what secondary school they would like their child to attend. Wichita Falls ISD ended the choice program for all schools beginning with the 2015-2016 year.

Secondary schools in the WFISD offer Advanced Placement and International Baccalaureate courses to students wishing to pursue a more challenging academic curriculum. The WFISD currently operates two schools with the International Baccalaureate program, covering two segments of the program:
G.H. Kirby Math/ Science Junior High and Hirschi High School partner in offering the Middle Years Programme
Hirschi High School, an IB World School, offers the IB Diploma Programme to juniors and seniors

The school district has continuously been recognized for its overall academic success from the Texas Education Agency and the Magnet Schools of America Association. In 1999 and 2001 respectively, Washington/ Jackson Math/Science Center and G.H. Kirby Junior High were awarded the Ronald P. Simpson award, giving them the title of "Best Magnet School in America" for a year. The district also boasts that many of its schools have received the Texas Blue Ribbon award or have attained "Exemplary" status from the TEA.

In 2005, Hirschi High School IB World Topics teacher Sherry Lindemann was named Texas Teacher of the Year where she represented the WFISD and thousands of Texas teachers at a formal ceremony held by President George W. Bush and First Lady Laura Bush in the White House Rose Garden.

In 2009, the school district was rated "academically acceptable" by the Texas Education Agency.

History

In 1908 the Texas Legislature issued a charter for the creation of the school district.

General information

School board
The Wichita Falls ISD is overseen by a Superintendent (Dr. Donny Lee), an Assistant Superintendent (Peter Griffiths), and a seven-member Board of Trustees who are elected either as at-large or district members. President of the Board of Trustees is currently Mike Rucker.

Enrollment
There are approximately 13,309 students in grades K-12 as of October 2022.

WFISD staff
1,923 total staff members
1,019 teachers
667 auxiliary/paraprofessional staff members.
(Wichita Falls ISD is the second largest industry in Wichita Falls behind Sheppard Air Force Base)

Teacher experience
Average Years Experience - 12.9 years
Average Years Experience with WFISD - 10.8 years
31.9% of WFISD Teachers Have 11-20 Years Experience

Budget
2005-2006 $88,026,794 (includes debt service, maintenance & operations, campus activity funds, special revenue funds)
Tax rate per $100 valuation: $1.56

Facilities
20 Elementary Schools
1 Early Childhood Center
3 Junior High Schools grades 7-8
3 High Schools grades 9-12
1 Career & Applied Technology Center
1 Accelerated Learning Center
1 Student Adjustment Center
1 Sports Complex - Memorial Stadium (Wichita Falls)
1 Administration Center
1 Support Center

Schools

Elementary schools
Ben Milam Elementary
Brook Village Early Childhood Center
Burgess Elementary
Crockett Elementary
Cunningham Elementary
Fain Elementary
Fowler Elementary
Franklin Elementary
Haynes Northwest Academy
Jefferson Elementary
Lamar Elementary
Scotland Park Elementary
Sheppard Elementary
Southern Hills Elementary
Booker T Elementary Academy
West Foundation Elementary
Zundy Elementary

High schools
Hirschi High School
Rider High School
Wichita Falls High School (Old High)

Alternative schools
Carrigan Career Center
Denver Alternative Center
Harrell Accelerated Learning Center
CEC CTE Learning

Junior high schools
Barwise Leadership Academy
Kirby World Academy
McNiel Junior High

Support staff
Carrigan Technology Support

Defunct schools
Reagan Junior High School – became Wichita Falls ISD Administration Building
Booker T. Washington High School (closed 1969, became Washington/Jackson Math/Science Center, name change back to Booker T. Washington in 2016)
Booker T. Washington Middle School (closed 1970)
Travis Elementary School
Austin Elementary (closed 2008)
Bonham Elementary (closed 2008)
Fannin Elementary (closed 2008)
McGaha Elementary (closed 2008)
 Alamo Elementary - The Times Record News has a photograph of a class for Alamo elementary held in 1909. 1910 was officially the year it opened, the cornerstone stated 1910, and most sources stated that it opened in 1910; the structure at the time had  of space. Official documents had 1919 as an opening date. It received additions in 1919, 1926, 1930, 1985, 1989, and 2009. The school received a gymnasium on the last date. Alamo closed in 2014; at the time it was the oldest school in the city. In 2016 WFISD considered demolishing the school. In 2017 the district announced that the school would not be torn down after all. R.C. Graham purchased Alamo for $101,000. Graham wanted the gymnasium was well, but the district did not sell the gymnasium to him and instead wished to retain it so it could hold district events there. Graham would have paid $106,000 for the gymnasium.
 Sam Houston School - It closed in 2014. The district considered storing items there.
Barwise/A. E. Holland School/Holland Alternative School - It opened in 1921, and was originally a grade 1-8 neighborhood school named Barwise School. It was reserved for white/non-black students only until it was converted into a school for black children in 1956. It was renamed A.E. Holland while the district established another school with the name Barwise. The neighborhood school closed in 1969 and was replaced with the alternative school, which closed in 2002 for financial reasons. In 2016 WFISD considered demolishing the school. In 2017 the district announced that the school would not be torn down after all. Gold Nugget Properties purchased the property for $101,000.
 Barwise Junior High
 Zundelowitz Junior High
 - Barwise and Zundy were combined in 2014 and renamed "Barwise Leadership Academy".

References

External links
Wichita Falls Independent School District Website

Education in Wichita Falls, Texas
School districts in Wichita County, Texas